Joseph Cordier was born on 1773. He was Acting Governor General of Pondicherry twice.

Titles

French colonial governors and administrators
Governors of French India
People of the Bourbon Restoration